= Elsbeth von Ameln =

German lawyer (1905–1990)

Elsbeth von Ameln (16 June 1905 in Cologne – 30 April 1990) was a German lawyer to the Allied military courts and later in the office - and Cologne Regional Court.

After graduating from high school, she began studying law in Marburg in 1925, where she was the only law student in her semester. Her professional goal was a criminal lawyer at the juvenile court. Until her retirement on 2 July 1984 she was instrumental in building the democratic judiciary in Cologne.

On 30 April 1990, Elsbeth von Ameln died in Cologne at the age of 84. She was buried in the family plot at Melaten Cemetery.
